Chloroclystis gymnoscelides is a moth in the  family Geometridae. It is found in South Africa.

References

Endemic moths of South Africa
Moths described in 1916
Chloroclystis
Moths of Africa